Meng Po is the goddess of forgetfulness in Chinese mythology, who serves Meng Po Soup on the Bridge of Forgetfulness or Naihe Bridge. This soup wipes the memory of the person so they can reincarnate into the next life without the burdens of the previous life. She awaits the dead souls at the entrance of the 9th round Fengdu.

Legends
According to Chinese mythology, there exist several realms beneath the Earth. Meng Po serves in Diyu, the Chinese realm of the dead, in the 10th court. It is her task to ensure that souls who are ready to be reincarnated do not remember their previous life or their time in hell.

To this end she collects herbs from various earthly ponds and streams to make her Five Flavored Tea of Forgetfulness. This is given to each soul to drink before they leave Diyu. The brew induces instant and permanent amnesia, and all memory of other lives is lost.

Having been purged of all previous sins and knowledge, the dead spirit is sent to be reborn in a new earthly incarnation according to the karma accrued over their previous lifetimes, and the cycle begins again. In Chinese tradition, there are legends of miracle births, where a newborn is able to speak because the soul of the baby didn't drink the Five Flavored Tea of Forgetfulness. Occasionally people are able to avoid drinking the brew, resulting in past life memories surfacing in children.

In some variations of the myth, the true identity of Meng Po is that of Lady Meng Jiang. After the death of her husband, Meng Jiang found herself unable to reincarnate due to her grief. In order to relieve the pain of life of other spirits, Lady Meng took the initiative to create a bowl of soup that would allow spirits to forget the suffering of their material life.

In popular culture
 The character increased in popularity in 2018 with the romance film The Ferry Man Manjusaka.
 Meng-p'o Macula, one of the equatorial dark regions on Pluto, is named after Meng Po.
 In the 2022 video game Dislyte, the character Jiang Man is blessed with Meng Po’s abilities.

See also 
 Yanluo Wang (閻羅王)
 Cheng Huang Gong (城隍公)
 Zhong Kui (鍾馗)
 Heibai Wuchang (黑白無常)
 Youdu (幽都)
 Ox-Head and Horse-Face
 Chinese folk religion
 List of supernatural beings in Chinese folklore
 Lethe

References

External links 
 Godchecker entry on Meng Po

Chinese goddesses
Death goddesses
Memory in culture
Reincarnation